The 1951–52 William & Mary Indians men's basketball team represented the College of William & Mary in intercollegiate basketball during the 1951–52 NCAA men's basketball season. Under the first, and only, year of head coach H. Lester Hooker, the team finished the season 15–13 and 10–6 in the Southern Conference. This was the 47th season of the collegiate basketball program at William & Mary, whose nickname is now the Tribe. William & Mary played its home games at Blow Gymnasium.

The Indians finished in 8th place in the conference and qualified as the #8 seed for the 1952 Southern Conference men's basketball tournament, hosted by North Carolina State University at Reynolds Coliseum in Raleigh, North Carolina, where the Indians lost to #10 West Virginia in the quarterfinals. William & Mary failed to qualify for a post-season tournament.

Program notes
The Indians played two teams for the first time this season: NYU and Pittsburgh.

Schedule

|-
!colspan=9 style="background:#006400; color:#FFD700;"| Regular season

|-
!colspan=9 style="background:#006400; color:#FFD700;"| 1952 Southern Conference Tournament

Source

References

William & Mary Tribe men's basketball seasons
William and Mary Indians
William and Mary Indians Men's Basketball Team
William and Mary Indians Men's Basketball Team